Joseph O'Donnell or José O'Donnell (1768–1836) was an Irish-Spanish general who commanded troops from the Kingdom of Spain against Imperial France during the Peninsular War. His father was Joseph O'Donnell the elder. Joseph was the brother of two other generals, the more famous Henry O'Donnell, 1st Count of la Bisbal and Charles O'Donnell. In 1808, Joseph was an officer on the staff of Pedro Caro, 3rd Marquis of la Romana during the escape of the Northern Division from Denmark. He was beaten by Nicolas Godinot at Zújar in 1811. After the disastrous loss of Valencia in January 1812, he ably reorganized the fragments of the Spanish army. While Captain General of Murcia, he suffered a severe defeat at the hands of Jean Isidore Harispe at Castalla in July 1812. He was superseded in command soon afterward.

References

Spanish soldiers
Spanish generals
Spanish commanders of the Napoleonic Wars
Spanish people of Irish descent
Joseph
1768 births
1836 deaths